Jim Rayburn, Jr (July 21, 1909 – December 11, 1970) was an American ordained Presbyterian minister and the founder of Young Life.

Early life and education 
He was born in Marshalltown, Iowa to James Chalmers Rayburn, Sr. (an evangelist for the Presbyterian Church), and Elna Beck Rayburn. Rayburn was the oldest of four sons and grew up in Newton, Kansas. His younger brother, Robert, became the founding president of both Covenant College and Covenant Theological Seminary.

Rayburn graduated from Kansas State University in 1941 with a Bachelor of Science degree in mineralogy. In 1936, Rayburn began his seminary education at Dallas Theological Seminary. While there, he was significantly influenced by the seminary's founder, Lewis Sperry Chafer.

Career 
Rayburn founded Young Life (originally known as Young Life Campaign), a Christian youth organization, after earning his master's degree. Rayburn left the presidency of Young Life in 1964.

He was a pioneer in the field of evangelism and was admired by many of the leading Christians of his day. He was known for his ability to communicate the gospel and his passion for Christ. Rayburn's personal journals were published in 2008 as The Diaries of Jim Rayburn.

Personal life 
In 1932, Rayburn married Helen Maxine Stanley. The couple had three children. Maxine Rayburn died in 1997. He died on December 11, 1970, at his home in Colorado Springs, Colorado.

Further reading

His life is described in several books including:
Cailliet, Emile; Young Life (1963)
Meridith, Char; It's a Sin to Bore a Kid: The Story of Young Life (1977) 
Miller, John; Back to the Basics about the early years of Young Life including a lot of Rayburn's life.
Rayburn, Jim: The Diaries of Jim Rayburn (2008) Rayburn's personal journals, edited and annotated by Kit Sublett Morningstar Press and Whitecaps Media 
Rayburn, Jim III; From Bondage To Liberty - Dance, Children, Dance a biography by his son (2000)  
The earlier edition was simply called Dance, Children, Dance (1984)

External links
The Jim Rayburn Foundation
Young Life Webpage
The Diaries of Jim Rayburn

1909 births
1970 deaths
American Presbyterian ministers
Dallas Theological Seminary alumni
People from Marshalltown, Iowa
20th-century American clergy